Andrew Edmond Goble is a professor of Japanese history at the University of Oregon in Eugene, Oregon.

Publications

Notes and references

External links 
 Biography at the Department of History at the University of Oregon

Living people
Year of birth missing (living people)
University of Oregon faculty
Australian academics